The SC Rapperswil-Jona Lakers are a professional ice hockey club from Rapperswil, Switzerland and are members of the National League.

History

The Lakers were founded in 1945 and were known as SC Rapperswil-Jona until 2005, when the club changed its name to Rapperswil-Jona Lakers and then again changed their name to SC Rapperswil-Jona Lakers in 2015. They play their home games at St. Galler Kantonalbank Arena.

NHL veteran Doug Gilmour skated for the Lakers during the NHL lockout-shortened season in 1994.

The Lakers had survived relegation in every NLA season since last making the playoffs in 2007–08 until the 2014–15 season, when they were swept by the SCL Tigers in the promotion/relegation round. They returned to the Swiss League for the 2015–16 season.

In 2017–18 season, the Lakers claimed the Swiss Cup, while also finishing victorious in the Swiss League Championship against EHC Olten and the promotion round against EHC Kloten marking their return to the National League after three years in the minor leagues.

Honors

Champions
Swiss League Championship (2): 1994, 2018
Swiss Cup Championship (1): 2018

Players

Current roster
Updated 8 February 2023.

References

External links

Rapperswil-Jona Lakers official website 

 
Ice hockey teams in Switzerland
Rapperswil-Jona
Culture of the canton of St. Gallen

Pascal Wüst